Sarahrud (also Romanized as Sarahrūd; also known as Sārārūd) is a village in Mazraeh Now Rural District, in the Central District of Ashtian County, Markazi Province, Iran. At the 2006 census, its population was 286, in 73 families.

References 

Populated places in Ashtian County